Éléonore Tenaille de Vaulabelle (Châtel-Censoir (Yonne) 20 vendémiaire an X   – Paris 12 October 1859 ) was a French writer and playwright. He published his novels under the pseudonym Ernest Desprez and all his plays under the name Jules Cordier.

Biography 

After he spent his youth in Bourgogne, Éléonore de Vaulabelle moved to Paris at the end of the Bourbon restauration. There he authored articles in several satirical newspapers as well as a daily pamphlet for Le Figaro, where he met Alphonse Karr and George Sand.

He wrote two novels under the pseudonym Ernest Desprez and a fictionalized autobiography: Un enfant. In Les Femmes vengées, he developed a theory inspired from Molière: "Women are what we make of them". Vaulabelle adds, "If women lie it is because we teach them to lie". But he devoted most of his work to theatre under the pseudonym Jules Cordier, most of the time in collaboration with Clairville. Only the collection of short stories Les Jours heureux appeared under his real name.

If he privately adhered to Republican ideas - probably under the influence of his older brother, Achille Tenaille de Vaulabelle, author of Histoire des deux Restaurations and Minister of Education under general Louis-Eugène Cavaignac's presidency in 1848 – in theatre, he expressed his opposition to the regime according to the forms of the time

Works

Theatre 

 1831: La Tireuse de cartes, melodrama in 3 acts by Ernest Desprez and Jules-Édouard Alboize, music by Obell, Théâtre Molière (9 June) then Théâtre de la Gaîté (13 April 1832) - J.-N. Barba, Paris, 1832 
 1834: Un enfant, drama in 4 acts by Charles Desnoyer and *** [Vaulabelle], imitated from the novel by Ernest Desprez, Théâtre de la Gaîté (21 June) - Marchant, Paris 
 1836: Clémentine, comédie-vaudeville in 1 act by Jacques-François Ancelot and J. Cordier, Théâtre du Palais-Royal (7 March) - Marchant, Paris 
 1838: Les Trois Dimanches, comédie-vaudeville in 3 acts by the Cogniard brothers and J. Cordier, Théâtre du Palais-Royal (19 August) - Marchant, Paris 
 1838: Contre fortune, bon cœur, comédie-vaudeville in 1 act by J. Cordier, Théâtre du Vaudeville (21 February) - Marchant, Paris, 1839
 1840: Le Mari de ma fille, comédie-vaudeville in 1 act by Jacques-François Ancelot and J. Cordier, Théâtre du Vaudeville (25 August) - Marchant, Paris
 1841: Les Willis,vaudeville in 1 act by Vaulabelle and Auguste Pittaud de Forges, Théâtre du Palais-Royal (19 October)
 1842: Le Mari à l'essai, comédie-vaudeville in 1 act by Jean-François Bayard and J. Cordier, Théâtre du Palais-Royal (4 May) - Beck, Paris
 1844: La Polka en province, folie-vaudeville in 1 act by Alexis Decomberousse and J. Cordier, Théâtre du Vaudeville (6 April) - Giroux and Vialat, Saint-Denis-du-Port
 1845: La Polka en province, folie-vaudeville in 1 act by A. Decomberousse and J. Cordier - Beck, Paris
 1846: Colombe et Perdreau, idylle in 3 acts by Clairville and J. Cordier, Théâtre des Variétés (15 August) - Maistrasse and Wiart, Paris
 1846: Les Dieux de l'Olympe à Paris, vaudeville in 6 tableaux by Clairville and J. Cordier, Théâtre du Vaudeville (26 February) - Beck, Paris
 1846: La Femme électrique, folie-vaudeville in 1 act by Clairville and J. Cordier, Théâtre du Palais-Royal (9 May) - Marchant, Paris
 1847: Éther, magnétisme et hatchis, à-propos-vaudeville in 1 act by Clairville and J. Cordier, Théâtre des Variétés (4 April) - Tresse, Paris, 1846
 1848:  Ah ! enfin ! pièce d'ouverture in 3 acts and 2 intermission by Clairville, J. Cordier and Léon Dumoustier, Théâtre du Vaudeville (29 April) - Beck, Paris
 1848:  L'Avenir dans le passé ou les Succès au paradis, à-propos-vaudeville in 1 act by Clairville and J. Cordier, Théâtre du Vaudeville (30 September) - Beck, Paris
 1848: Le Club des maris et le Club des femmes, vaudeville in 1 act by Clairville and J. Cordier, Théâtre du Vaudeville (4 June) - Beck, Paris
 1848: Les Filles de la liberté, à-propos-vaudeville in 1 act, by Clairville and J. Cordier, thTâtre du Gymnase-Dramatique (14 March) - Beck, Paris
 1848: Les Parades de nos pères, folie in 3 tableaux from ancient parades by Dumanoir, Clairville and J. Cordier, Théâtre Montansier (6 October) - G. Olivier, Paris
 1848: La Tireuse de cartes, vaudeville in 1 act by Clairville and J. Cordier, Théâtre des Variétés (9 January) - Beck, Paris
 1848: Un petit de la mobile, comédie-vaudeville in 2 acts by Clairville and J. Cordier, Théâtre des Variétés (7 August) - Beck, Paris
 1849: Daphnis et Chloé, vaudeville in 1 act by Clairville and J. Cordier, Théâtre du Vaudeville (23 November) - Beck, Paris
 1849: Les Grenouilles qui demandent un roi, vaudeville in 1 act by Clairville, Arthur de Beauplan and J. Cordier, Théâtre du Gymnase (26 February) - Beck, Paris
 1849: Les Partageux, vaudeville in 1 act by Clairville and J. Cordier, Théâtre du Gymnase-Dramatique (17 November) - Beck, Paris
 1848: La Propriété, c'est le vol, folie-socialiste in 3 acts and 7 tableaux by Clairville and J. Cordier, Théâtre du Vaudeville (28 November) - Beck, Paris, 1849
 1849: Les Représentants en vacances, comédie vaudeville in 3 acts by Clairville and J. Cordier, Théâtre du Gymnase-Dramatique (15 September) - Beck, Paris
 1849: Une semaine à Londres ou les Trains de plaisirs, folie-vaudeville extravaganza in 3 acts and 11 tableaux by Clairville and J. Cordier, music by Victor Chéri, Théâtre du Vaudeville (9 August) - Beck, Paris ; new version, Théâtre des Variétés, 23 June 1862 - Dentu, Paris
 1850: L'Alchimiste ou le Train de plaisir pour la Californie, vaudeville in 3 acts by Clairville and J. Cordier, Théâtre des Variétés (8 August) - Beck, Paris
 1850: Le Bourgeois de Paris ou les Leçons au Pouvoir, comédie-vaudeville in 3 acts and 6 tableaux, Théâtre du Gymnase-Dramatique (15 June) - Dondey-Dupré, Paris
 1850: C'en était un ! pochade in 1 act, mingled with couplets by Clairville and J. Cordier, Théâtre Montansier (31 May) - Beck, Paris
 1849: Paris sans impôts, vaudeville in 3 acts and 6 tableaux by Clairville and J. Cordier, Théâtre du Vaudeville (28 December) - Beck, Paris, 1850
 1850: Les Tentations d'Antoinette, vaudeville in 5 acts by Clairville and J. Cordier, Théâtre du Gymnase (29 November) - Beck, Paris
 1850: Les Secrets du diable, féerie-vaudeville in 2 acts, extravaganza by Clairville and J. Cordier, Théâtre du Vaudeville (23 February) - Beck, Paris
 1851: Le Duel au baiser, comedy mingled with couplets in 1 act by Clairville and J. Cordier, Théâtre Montansier (17 June) - Beck, Paris
 1851: La Dot de Marie, comédie-vaudeville in 1 act by Clairville and J. Cordier, Théâtre du Gymnase (18 January) - D. Giraud and J. Dagneau, Paris
 1850: Le Journal pour rire, revue in 1 act and 3 tableaux by Clairville and J. Cordier, Théâtre de la Porte-Saint-Martin (25 December) - Beck, Paris, 1851
 1851: Le Palais de cristal ou les Parisiens à Londres, grande revue on the occasion of The Great Exhibition, Théâtre de la Porte-Saint-Martin (26 May) - Beck, Paris
 1852: Les Compagnons d'Ulysse, vaudeville in 1 act and 2 tableaux by Clairville and J. Cordier, Théâtre du Vaudeville (5 July) - Beck, Paris
 1852: La Maîtresse d'été et la Maîtresse d'hiver, comédie-vaudeville in 3 acts by Clairville and J. Cordier, Théâtre du Vaudeville (29 May) - Beck, Paris
 1852: La Mère Moreau, « débit de chinois, mêlé de prunes et de couplets », pochade in 1 act by Clairville and J. Cordier, Théâtre du Palais-Royal (1 August) - Beck, Paris
 1852: La Queue du diable, vaudeville fantastique in 3 acts by Clairville and J. Cordier, Théâtre de la Porte-Saint-Martin (29 July) - Beck, Paris
 1851: La Vénus à la fraise, folie in 1 act mingled with couplets by Clairville and J. Cordier, Théâtre du Palais-Royal (31 December) - Beck, Paris, 1852
 1852:  Les Abeilles et les Violettes, revue extravaganza in 6 tableaux by Clairville and J. Cordier, Théâtre du Vaudeville (28 December) - Beck, Paris, 1853 (read Online)
 1853: Le Baromètre des amours, comédie-vaudeville in 5 acts, by Clairville and J. Cordier, Théâtre du Vaudeville (11 January) - Beck, Paris
 1853: Cadet-Roussel, Dumollet, Gribouille et Cie, bambochade in 3 acts, preceded with a prologue in verses, Théâtre des Folies-Dramatiques (15 June) - Beck, Paris ; rééd. Tresse, Paris, 1860
 1853: L'Esprit frappeur ou les Sept Merveilles du jour, comédie-vaudeville in 1 act by Clairville and J. Cordier, music by Sylvain Mangeant, Théâtre du Palais-Royal (17 December) - Beck, Paris
 1853: Fraichement décorée, à-propos-vaudeville in 1 act by Clairville and J. Cordier, Théâtre du Palais-Royal (25 June) - Beck, Paris
 1853: La Vie à bon marché, vaudeville in 1 act by Clairville, J. Cordier and Louis Couailhac, Théâtre du Vaudeville (5 April) - Beck, Paris
 1854: Les Contes de la Mère l'oie, grande féerie in 5 acts and 22 tableaux by Clairville and J. Cordier, Théâtre de l'Ambigu-Comique (20 May) - Beck, Paris
 1854: Mesdames les pirates, vaudeville extravaganza by Clairville and J. Cordier, Théâtre du Vaudeville (25 February) - Beck, Paris
 1854: La Mort de Pompée, comédie-vaudeville in 3 acts by J. Cordier, Théâtre du Palais-Royal (18 July) - J. Dagneau, Paris
 1855: Les Binettes contemporaines, revue in 3 acts and 7 tableaux by Clairville and J. Cordier, Théâtre du Palais-Royal (23 December) - Beck, Paris
 1858: Un dîner et des égards, comédie-vaudeville in 1 act by J. Cordier and Léon Dumoustier, Théâtre du Palais-Royal (13 June) - Michel-Lévy frères, Paris
 1858: Une dame pour voyager, vaudeville in 1 act by J. Cordier, Théâtre des Variétés (31 May) - Michel-Lévy frères, Paris
 1859: Le Banquet des Barbettes, comédie-vaudeville in 2 acts by Clairville and J. Cordier, Théâtre du Palais-Royal (17 June) - Beck, Paris
 1866 (posthumous): Daphnis et Chloé, opéra-bouffe in 1 act by Clairville and J. Cordier, music by Jacques Offenbach, Théâtre des Bouffes-Parisiens (6 October) - Beck, Paris

Novels and other texts 
 Épître à Sidi Mahmoud... after Quérard, with Jules Méry, Ladvocat, Paris, 1825
 L'Étang de Varzy (short story) in Journal des enfans, Everat, Paris, 1832-1833 (Read Online)
 Le Troc des âges (tale) in Journal des enfans, Everat, Paris, 1832-1833 (Read Online)
 Les Grisettes à Paris, Ladvocat, Paris, 1832 (Read Online) ; rééd. la Première Heure, Marseille, 2007
 Le dimanche à Paris, Nouveau tableau de Paris au XIX me siècle, tome deuxième, Librairie de Madame Charles-Béchet, Paris, 1834 (Read Online)
 Les Jours heureux, contes et morale à l'usage des enfans des deux sexes, Dumont, Paris, 1836 (Read Online)

under the pseudonym Ernest Desprez
 Une seconde famille (nouvelle) in Journal des enfans, Everat, Paris, 1832-1833
 Un enfant (roman), 3 vol., C. Gosselin, Paris, 1833 (Read Online)
 Les Femmes vengées (roman), 2 vol., A. Ledoux, Paris, 1834
 Le Fils de Claire d'Albe (nouvelle) dans Le Sachet, Poulton, Paris, 1835

under the pseudonyme de  C. de Saint-Estève
 M. de Similor en Californie, A. Courcier, Paris, 1856 (2e éd.)

Arbre généalogique

Bibliography 
 Frédéric de Berthier de Grandry, La Famille d’Achille Tenaille de Vaulabelle (1799-1879), un ministre pionnier de l’Education nationale, préface de Jean-Pierre Soisson, Paris, 1998-2004,
 Philibert Audebrand, « Le Journal au théâtre », Petits mémoires d'une stalle d'orchestre : acteurs, actrices, auteurs, journalistes, Paris, Jules Lévy libraire-éditeur, 1885, .
 « Éléonore Tenaille de Vaulabelle », Biographie universelle ancienne et moderne, t.|95, Beck, 1862, .

References 

19th-century French dramatists and playwrights
19th-century French journalists
French male journalists
People from Yonne
1801 births
1859 deaths
19th-century French male writers